The Filocolo (orig.  Il Filocolo) is a novel written by Giovanni Boccaccio between 1335-36. It is considered to be the first novel of Italian literature written in prose. It is based on a very popular story of the time, Florio e Biancifiore.

"The Franklin's Tale" of Geoffrey Chaucer's The Canterbury Tales is based on The Filocolo.

This work dates from Boccaccio's youth; it was written during his stay in Naples in 1336.

The two protagonists are Florio, son of the King of Spain, and Biancifiore, an orphan. Having grown up together they are in love, and they are forced to undergo many adventures and misfortunes that divide them. In the end, after Florio's many journeys in search of his love under the pseudonym of Filocolo, they are reunited.

During a stay in Naples, Florio, thwarted by a tempest at sea, is walking near the tomb of Virgil, where he finds himself attracted by the melody coming from a neighbouring garden. Here he encounters Caleone (who represents Boccaccio himself), who is part of a "noble brigade" and invites Florio to join them. Another member of the group is Fiammetta (Maria d'Aquino) who is elected their queen. Each of the group in turn proposes a question of love. This section is particularly significant because it foreshadows the scheme of the Decameron.

The material is drawn from popular tradition; the adventures of Florio and Biancifiore were as well known in Europe as those of Tristan and Isolde. In Italy there was a popular poem in ottava rima entitled Cantare di Florio e Biancifiore. Boccaccio, however, made a distinctive version of the story, inaugurating his new prose style.

14th-century novels
Medieval Italian literature
Works by Giovanni Boccaccio
Italian novels